Jasen is both a masculine given name and a surname. Notable people with the name include:

Given name:
Jasen Fisher, American actor
Jasen Mesić, Croatian politician
Jasen Rauch, American musician

Surname:
Hernán Jasen, Argentine basketball player
Matthew J. Jasen, American lawyer and politician

Masculine given names